František Kaberle (born 6 August 1951 in Kladno, Czechoslovakia) is a Czech former professional ice hockey defenceman.

Kaberle spent the majority of his career with HC Kladno where he won five Czechoslovak Extraliga championships and was instrumental in the team's exhibition game victory over the Toronto Maple Leafs in 1977. He was also a member of the Czechoslovak national ice hockey team in the mid-1970s winning the World Championships twice, in 1976 and 1977.  He also played at the 1980 Winter Olympics.

Personal life
He is the father of Tomáš Kaberle and František Kaberle, who both went on to play in the National Hockey League.

References

External links

1951 births
Living people
Czech ice hockey defencemen
Czechoslovak ice hockey defencemen
HC Dukla Jihlava players
Ice hockey players at the 1980 Winter Olympics
Olympic ice hockey players of Czechoslovakia
Sportspeople from Kladno
Rytíři Kladno players
Czechoslovak expatriate sportspeople in Germany
Czechoslovak expatriate ice hockey people
Czech ice hockey coaches
Czechoslovak ice hockey coaches